Greatheart is a 1921 British silent drama film directed by George Ridgwell and starring Cecil Humphreys, Madge Stuart and Olive Sloane. It was based on the 1918 novel Greatheart by Ethel M. Dell. It was made by Stoll Pictures.

Cast
 Cecil Humphreys as Eustace Studley 
 Madge Stuart as Diana Bathurst 
 Ernest Benham as Sir Scott Studley 
 Olive Sloane as Rose de Vigne 
 William Farris as Guy Bathurst 
 Norma Whalley as Isobel Evrard 
 Winifred Evans as Lady Grace de Vigne 
 Paulette del Baye as Mrs. Bathurst 
 Teddy Arundell as Colonel de Vigne

References

External links

1921 films
1921 drama films
British drama films
British silent feature films
Films directed by George Ridgwell
Films based on works by Ethel M. Dell
Films based on British novels
British black-and-white films
Stoll Pictures films
1920s English-language films
1920s British films
Silent drama films